The Strypa is a river in Ternopil Oblast, Western Ukraine. It is a left-bank tributary of the Dniester that flows southward for 147 km through Ternopil oblast and drains a basin area of 1,610 km2 (12% territory of Ternopil Oblast). The river is generally approximately 30 m wide and has a sharply defined valley. Its waters are used for industry and agriculture. A small water reservoir has been built on it. The major centers located along the river include Zboriv, Buchach, and Zarvanytsia.

Its main tributaries are Western Strypa, Vosushka, Vil'khovets', and Studenka.

Sources

External links
 Strypa River / Encyclopedia of Ukraine
 Strypa River in the Encyclopedia of Ukraine, article originally appeared in the Encyclopedia of Ukraine, vol. 5 (1993).

 
Rivers of Ternopil Oblast
Austrian Empire–Russian Empire border